Balagtas, officially the Municipality of Balagtas,  is a 1st class municipality in the province of Bulacan, Philippines. According to the 2020 census, it has a population of 77,018 people.

With the continuous expansion of Metro Manila, the municipality is now part of Manila's built up area which reaches San Ildefonso in its northernmost part.

Formerly known as Bigaa, it was renamed in honor of Filipino poet Francisco Balagtas. The MacArthur Highway bisects the municipality of Balagtas as this national road cuts northward to the Ilocos region. At the southern approach of the town from Manila is a concrete bridge that crosses the Balagtas River. The river, navigable by banca and motor boats, empties into Manila bay after snaking through the town of Bulacan to the West which provides Balagtas' townsfolk with fish, shrimp, and other fresh water food.

At the foot of the bridge, along the highway towards the North, is the town hall. In front of the town hall is a park where the monument of its hero, Francisco "Balagtas" Baltazar is located. The town hall is surrounded by Spanish colonial type houses. Two hundred meters from the municipal hall is the barrio of Panginay, the birthplace of Francisco Balagtas, for whom also "Balagtasan", a form of debate in versified Tagalog, was named. In 1946 the Historical Society of the Philippines placed a marker at the birthplace of Balagtas. In reverence to the hero's deeds, the official name of Bigaa was changed to Balagtas through the legislative act sponsored by then Congressman, Teodulo Natividad.

History

Originally known as Caruya/Caluya as per the historical records regarding the early years of the establishment of Bulacan Province, Caruya was one of the Encomiendas of the vast region La Pampanga falls under the Alcalde Mayor of Bulacan. Encomienda de Caruya was Encomienda of the King of Spain which appeared in Miguel de Loarca's Relacion de las Isla Filipinas in 1582 and the Report of Governor-General Luis Perez de Dasmariñas of June 21, 1591 document. The propagation of catholic instructions in Caruya initially belongs to Bulakan Convent and it was directly administered by Alcalde Mayor of Bulacan but it was transferred to Malolos Convent at an uncertain date. Bigaa is one of the ancient towns of the Province together with Calumpit 1571 (became Town in 1575) Bulakan 1575 (became Town in 1578) Meycauayan 1578, Malolos 1571 (became Town in 1580), and Binto 1581 (a former visita of Malolos became Town renamed as Binto y Quingua 1602) later known as Plaridel. The Catalogo of 1591 indicates the existence of Guiguinto y Caruyan with 4,800 souls and it was administered by a religious from Bulacan Convent. In 1608 Historia de la Provincia Agustiana mentioned Caruyan as pueblo and convent.
The Catalogo of 1612 says that Caruyan had 2 sacerdos, 800 Tributos, 2,400 Almas. (Historia de La Provincia Agustiana del Santisimo Nombre de Jesus de Filipinas
Vol.1 of Isacio Rodriguez OSA)

On other data, the Center for Bulacan Studies in their "La Primera Provincia" published in 2010 p. 138 mentioned that Bigaa came from Malolos as its matrix with an independence date of 1621. It could be assumed that Bigaa was later transferred to Malolos Cathedral Convent in uncertain date but La Primera did not mention that Bigaa originally came from Bulakan town but instead in Malolos.

A long time before the construction of the church at Poblacion, the original location of the town center where the hermitage and the base of Spanish instruction in Bigaa were at Barrio Dalig where Sitio Caruyan was located.

It is very unclear when Caruya was formally organized into an administrative town with its own Gobernadorcillo. It was renamed Bigaa sometime in the 1700s. Bigaa suggests a kind of plant which is Taro o Gabi.

During the Philippine revolution the "insurrectos" and the "Guardia civiles". Many people died, further decimating the town, which has suffered from a cholera epidemic and nearly wiped out the population 20 years before. When the Americans established civil government in 1903, Bigaa and Bocaue were integrated with each other and in 1911, it was separated again and in the same year, the former Hacienda de Pandi, which included in the geographical jurisdiction of Town of Bigaa. In 1946, during the tenure of Bigaa Mayor Manuel Santos, Pandi was detached from Bigaa shortly after the Philippines gained political freedom from the United States and Pandi was established as a municipal entity by virtue of legislative fiat.

Geography
Balagtas was part of 2nd district along with Baliwag, Bocaue, Bustos, Guiguinto, and Pandi from 1987 to 2022. It was moved to 5th district along with Bocaue, Guiguinto, and Pandi

Barangays
Balagtas is politically subdivided into 9 barangays, all classified as urban:

Climate

Demographics

Economy

Major Industries
 Ceramics/Pottery
 Furniture
 Garments
 Gifts/Houseware/Decors
 Metalcraft
 Poultry

Major Products
 Furniture/Agricultural Products
 Balot and Penoy Industry
 Recruitment Agency
 Fruit Dealership
 Tilapia
 Tricycle Parts

Future Developments
 Construction of North Food Exchange
 Opening of Balagtas Tollgate
 Construction of new Balagtas to Baliwag road connection
Construction of the Balagtas Station of North–South Commuter Railway

Government
2022-2025 Municipal Officials:
Mayor: Eladio "JR" E. Gonzales Jr. (PDP-Laban)
Vice Mayor: Ariel C. Valderama (PDP-Laban)
Councilors:
 Alberto "Bobby" G. Carating II (PDP-Laban)
 Julius Daniel G. Abarzosa (PDP-Laban)
 Mikee Jane "Monay" A. Payuran (NUP)
 Babby "Bobby" L. Estrella (NUP)
 Charles Louie B. Galvez (PDP-Laban) 
 Gilbert "Obet" L. Galvez (PDP-Laban)
 Fernando "Fernan" K. Galvez (PDP-Laban)
 Alejandro "Andy" P. De Guzman (PDP-Laban)

Education
Tertiary:
 College of St. Lawrence (formerly St. Lawrence Academy), Borol 1st, Balagtas
 Garden Angels Integrated School, Borol 1st, Balagtas
 STI College Balagtas, Campus, Borol 1st,Balagtas
 Colegio de Roma, San Juan, Balagtas
 Our Lady of Manaoag Montessori College, (OLMA) San Juan, Balagtas
 A-Z Country Day School 
 Bulacan Merchant Marine Academy

Secondary:
 La Consolacion School, Longos, Balagtas
 Balagtas Agricultural School, Pulong Gubat, Balagtas (Main Campus)
 Balagtas Agricultural School, Borol 1st, Balagtas (Annex)
 Children's Mindware School, Borol 2nd, Balagtas

Elementary (Public):
Balagtas Central School
Francisco Balagtas Memorial School
San Juan Elementary School
Longos Elementary School
Borol 1st Elementary School
Borol 2nd Elementary School
Sulok Elementary School
Marciano C. Rivera Elementary School
Santol Elementary School
Dalig Elementary School
Balagtas Heights Elementary School
Northville VI Elementary School

Notable personalities
 Regine Velasquez – Multi-awarded singer, actress and record producer

Gallery

References

External links

[ Philippine Standard Geographic Code]
Philippine Census Information
bulacan.gov.ph
Balagtas Bulacan

See also
 List of renamed cities and municipalities in the Philippines

Municipalities of Bulacan